Halifax Needham is a provincial electoral district in Halifax, Nova Scotia, Canada, that elects one member of the Nova Scotia House of Assembly.  It has existed since 1967, though its boundaries have changed periodically.

Halifax Needham encompasses what is largely known as the North End of Halifax. It has been held by members of each of the three major political parties in Nova Scotia at different times. The riding was once the home of Liberal Premier Gerald Regan before going to Progressive Conservative Edmund L. Morris for the majority of the 1980s. Morris served as a Member of Parliament for Halifax under Progressive Conservative Prime Minister John Diefenbaker before becoming the Mayor of Halifax. He served in the Provincial Cabinet as Minister of Intergovernmental Affairs, Municipal Affairs, Fisheries, and Social Services.

When he stepped down in 1988, the Progressive Conservatives lost the seat in that election to Gerry O'Malley, who was unseated from his position as Liberal Minister of Supply and Services in 1998. Maureen MacDonald held the seat from 1998 until 2016. The seat is considered a reasonably safe seat for the NDP, though the 2013 election was close, amid a province-wide swing to the Liberals.

It was created in 1966 when Halifax North was divided into three districts, one of which was Halifax City North East. The district was renamed Halifax Needham in 1967. In 2003, it gained an area east of Citadel Hill from Halifax Citadel. In 2013, it lost the area south of Robie Street and east of Young Street to Halifax Chebucto and gained the area north of Bayers Road and east of Connaught Avenue from Halifax Chebucto.

Members of the Legislative Assembly
This riding has elected the following Members of the Legislative Assembly:

Geography

Election results

1967 general election

1970 general election

1974 general election

1978 general election

1981 general election

1984 general election

1988 general election

1993 general election

1998 general election

1999 general election

2003 general election

2006 general election

2009 general election

2013 general election 

|-
 
|New Democratic Party
|Maureen MacDonald
|align="right"| 3,392
|align="right"| 43.99
|align="right"| -23.25
|-
 
|Liberal
|Chris Poole 
|align="right"| 3,115
|align="right"| 40.40
|align="right"| +18.51
|-
 
|Progressive Conservative
|Mary D.S. Hamblin
|align="right"| 834
|align="right"| 10.82
|align="right"| +4.23
|-

|align="right"| 369
|align="right"| 4.79
|align="right"| +0.51

2016 by-election 

|-
 
|New Democratic Party
|Lisa Roberts
|align="right"| 2,519
|align="right"| 50.97
|align="right"| +6.98
|-
 
|Liberal
|Rod Wilson
|align="right"| 1,662
|align="right"| 33.63
|align="right"| -6.77
|-
 
|Progressive Conservative
|Andy Arsenault
|align="right"| 600
|align="right"| 12.14
|align="right"| +1.32
|-

|align="right"| 161
|align="right"| 3.26
|align="right"| -1.53

2017 general election

2021 general election

References

External links
2006 Poll by Poll Results
 2003 Poll by Poll Results
2003 riding profile
1999 Poll by Poll Results
1998 Poll by Poll Results
Mauren MacDonald, MLA

Nova Scotia provincial electoral districts
Politics of Halifax, Nova Scotia